Liu Yali is the name of:

Liu Yali (skier) (born 1968), Chinese Alpine skier
Liu Yali (footballer) (born 1980), Chinese association footballer